Bayaluseeme or Bayalu Seeme is the area lying to the east of Malenadu, a region of Karnataka state in India. The area is largely open plain, with few hillocks. It includes the districts of Bangalore, Bagalkot, Bijapur, Chitradurga, Davanagere, Dharwad, Gadag, Hassan, Haveri, Mandya, Mysore, and Tumkur.

Topography
Bayalu Seeme has a gently rolling surface, punctuated by several of the large rivers that rise in the Western Ghats and flow eastward to empty into the Bay of Bengal. It is often subdivided into the northern and southern Bayalu Seeme.

Northern Bayalu Seeme
Northern Bayalu Seeme is a dry, mostly treeless expanse of plateau, its elevation being between 300 and 700 meters. It covers Belgaum district, Ballari district, Bidar district, Bagalkot district, Bijapur district, Chitradurga district, Dharwad district, Kalaburagi district and Raichur district. It is drained by the Krishna River and its tributaries the Bhima River, Ghataprabha River, Malaprabha River, and Tungabhadra River. It mostly lies within the Deccan thorn scrub forests' ecoregion, which extends north into eastern Maharashtra and east into Telangana.

Southern Bayalu Seeme
Southern Bayalu Seeme, also known as the Southern Karnataka Plateau, is made up of the low rolling granite hills from 600 to 900 meters elevation. It is bounded on the west by the Western Ghats and on the south and east by ranges of hills, and on the north it drops to the lower-elevation northern Maidan. The plateau is drained by the Kaveri river along with its tributaries - Shimsha, Arkavati, Kabini, Lakshmana Tirtha and Hemavati. The Palar, Ponnaiyar and Uttara Pinakini rivers arise from the eastern region of this plateau at Nandi Hills. It includes Bangalore Urban district, Bangalore Rural district, Chamarajanagar district, Hassan district, Kolar district, Mandya district, Mysuru district, Tumkur district and parts of Chikkamagaluru district. Most of the southern Maidan is covered by the South Deccan Plateau dry deciduous forests ecoregion, which extends south into eastern Tamil Nadu.

Vegetation
Bayalu Seeme lies in the rain shadow of the Western Ghats, and is generally much drier than Coastal Karnataka (Karavali) and the Western Ghats. The region was originally covered by extensive, open-canopied Tropical dry deciduous forests, characterized by the trees Acacia, Albizia and Hardwickia. But much of the original forest has been cleared for agriculture, timber, grazing and firewood.

Overexploitation of the forests for fuelwood and fodder has resulted in much of the original forest being degraded into thickets and scrublands. Canthium parriflorum, Cassia auriculata, Dodonaea viscosa, Erythroxylum monogynum, Pterolobium hexapetalum and Euphorbia antiquorum are species typical of the thicket and scrubland vegetation.

See also
 Bangalore Division
 Cauvery Wildlife Sanctuary
 Kaveri River

References

Regions of Karnataka